John Edward Wylie (26 September July 1936 – 18 September 2013) was a footballer who played as a right half for Preston North End, Stockport County, and Doncaster Rovers.

Senior club career

Huddersfield Town
Joining Division One side Huddersfield Town from school, Wylie never made a first team appearance in his three seasons there.

Preston North End
Division One, Preston North End signed him in May 1957 on a free transfer. On Boxing Day 1960 he captained the team. He went on to make 110 League and cup appearances for the club.

Stockport County
He was signed by Fourth Division team Stockport County for £3,500 in November 1962.

Doncaster Rovers
Wylie was signed by fellow Fourth Division side Doncaster Rovers in August 1964, his debut being in a 1–0 home victory against Aldershot on 29 August 1964. He would have started in the first two games of the season but for serving a suspension from being sent off for striking an opponent in the previous season. He went on to play in every league and cup game for the remainder of that season and the following season, one small blight with him being substituted against Barnsley in May 1966. He missed some games the following season, with him getting to an unbroken sequence of 101 League appearances, and 118 in total including the FA and League Cup games.

He was ever present in the 1965–66 Fourth Division title winning side.

His last game for Rovers was in September 1967 against Wrexham where he was substituted by Graham Ricketts. After the 1967–68 season at Doncaster, he moved to play for Scarborough.

Honours
Doncaster Rovers

Fourth Division
 Winner 1965–66

References

1936 births
2013 deaths
Footballers from Newcastle upon Tyne
English footballers
English Football League players
Association football wing halves
Huddersfield Town A.F.C. players
Preston North End F.C. players
Stockport County F.C. players
Doncaster Rovers F.C. players
Scarborough F.C. players